BPM High School, Khar (estd on 30-5-1941) is recognized by the Education Department of the Government of Maharashtra. This school is conducted by Mumbai Suburban Education Society, Khar. The school introduced English Medium in June 1966.

Special attention is paid to extracurricular activities. Students are encouraged to participate in various activities, organized by inter school associations and social organizations. Excursions and education tours are sometimes organized.

The students are also encouraged to make use of the library and reading room in order to develop the self-study habit.

The school runs a Registered Students Co-operative Stores with an objective of making notebooks and stationary available at reasonable price to the students. Students are informed that they can buy notebooks, etc. from Students' Co-op Stores only.

The school works in 2 shifts, the first shift from 7:05am to 12:30pm (5th-7th std) and the 2nd shift from 12:40pm to 5:40pm. (8th-10th std). Students may be detained after school hours for different activities, if required.

Ganpati festival

Ganpati festival celebrated in this school for 5 days. Lord Ganesha is brought in the school one day prior to the festival by the school students and teachers while students throw gulaal and dance to the beats of dhol. Ganpati visarjan takes place on the 5th day at Juhu beach by school staff and a few students.

Sports
BPM High School has a large playground. Because many schools in the vicinity don't have a ground, their sports are held at BPM High School.

BPM High School has two volleyball/throwball courts.

Sports week is held in December just before the Christmas vacation.

Sports like langadi (for 5th, 6th, 7th std), kabaddi (for 7th, 8th,9th,10th  std), throwball (for 9th & 10th std girls) and volleyball (for 9th & 10th boys) are played with the volleyball final of 10th std being the most awaited and most tough match of the year.

References

External links 
 School web site

High schools and secondary schools in Mumbai